Hospital de Santo António dos Capuchos ("Hospital of Saint Anthony of the Capuchins"), more commonly referred to simply as Hospital dos Capuchos, is a public Central Hospital serving the Greater Lisbon area as part of the Central Lisbon University Hospital Centre (CHULC), a state-owned enterprise.

The complex results from several modifications of the former Convent of Saint Anthony of the Capuchins, established in 1579 and partially destroyed in the 1755 Lisbon earthquake. In 1836, Queen Maria II converted the former convent into an Asylum for the Poor. In 1928, the Asylum was transferred to the town of Alcobaça and the complex was repurposed into a hospital.

References

External links
 Official site

1928 establishments in Portugal
Hospitals in Lisbon